The 1988 NCAA Women's Golf Championships were contested at the seventh annual NCAA-sanctioned golf tournament to determine the individual and team national champions of women's collegiate golf in the United States. Until 1996, the NCAA would hold just one annual women's golf championship for all programs across Division I, Division II, and Division III.

The tournament was held at the New Mexico State University Golf Course in Las Cruces, New Mexico.

Tulsa won the team championship, but the Golden Hurricane's title was later vacated by the NCAA due to rules violations by the track and field team. Arizona State and Georgia remained tied for second place.

Melissa McNamara, from Tulsa, won the individual title but likewise had her title subsequently vacated.

Individual results

Individual champion
  (287, −9)

Team results

 DC = Defending champion
 Debut appearance

References

NCAA Women's Golf Championship
Golf in New Mexico
NCAA Women's Golf Championship
NCAA Women's Golf Championship